Bill Walters (April 17, 1943 – March 5, 2013) was an American lawyer, businessman, and politician.

Born in Paris in Logan County in western Arkansas, Walters received his Bachelor of Arts from the University of Arkansas at Fayetteville and his Juris Doctor from the University of Arkansas School of Law. He practiced law in Greenwood in Sebastian County and was a prosecuting attorney, municipal judge, and was engaged in the real estate business. He served from 1983 to 2000 in the Arkansas State Senate as a Republican. His wife, Shirley Ann Walters, served from 2003 to 2008 in the Arkansas House of Representatives as a Republican.

Walters ran in 2008 as a Democrat to succeed his wife in the Arkansas House, but he was defeated by Republican nominee Terry Rice of Waldron.

Walters died at the age of sixty-nine in Greenwood, Arkansas.

Notes 

1943 births
2013 deaths
People from Paris, Arkansas
People from Greenwood, Arkansas
University of Arkansas alumni
University of Arkansas School of Law alumni
Arkansas lawyers
Businesspeople from Arkansas
American real estate businesspeople
Arkansas Republicans
Arkansas Democrats
Arkansas state senators
20th-century American businesspeople
20th-century American lawyers